Tazovsky (Nenets: Хальмер” седа, Hal’merꜧ seda) is a rural locality (a settlement) and the administrative center of Tazovsky District in Yamalo-Nenets Autonomous Okrug, Russia, located on the Taz River  from its fall into the Taz Estuary. Population: 

Tazovsky Airport (ICAO airport code: USDT) is located next to Tazovsky.

History
Until 1949, it was known as Khalmer-Sede—a Nenets name literally meaning the hill of the dead, due to an old Nenets cemetery at this location. It had urban-type settlement status until January 1, 2013.

Climate

References

Rural localities in Yamalo-Nenets Autonomous Okrug
Road-inaccessible communities of Russia